von Bahr is a surname. Notable people with this surname include:

Eva von Bahr (1874–1962), Swedish physicist and teacher
Eva von Bahr (1968–), Swedish make-up and hair stylist
Margaretha von Bahr (1921–2016), Finnish ballet dancer and choreographer
Niki Lindroth von Bahr (1984–), Swedish director and animator
Stig von Bahr (1939–), Swedish lawyer

See also
Bahr (surname)

Swedish-language surnames